Henry, King of Navarre is a 1924 British silent historical film directed by Maurice Elvey and starring Matheson Lang, Gladys Jennings and Henry Victor. It was based on a novel by Alexandre Dumas.

Cast
 Matheson Lang as Henry 
 Gladys Jennings as Marguerite de Valois 
 Henry Victor as Duc de Guise 
 Stella St. Audrie as Catherine de' Medici 
 Humberston Wright a Charles XI 
 Harry Agar Lyons as Pierre 
 Madame d'Esterre as Jeanne d'Albert

References

External links

1920s historical films
1924 films
British historical films
British silent feature films
1920s English-language films
Films based on French novels
Films based on works by Alexandre Dumas
Films directed by Maurice Elvey
British black-and-white films
1920s British films